Berntsen may refer to:

Aage Berntsen (1885–1952), Danish doctor, fencer and writer
Annie Skau Berntsen (1911–1992), Norwegian missionary
Bernt Berntsen (1863–1933), Norwegian-American missionary
Bjarne Berntsen (born 1956), Norwegian footballer
Daniel Berntsen (born 1993), Norwegian footballer
Einar Berntsen (1891–1965), Norwegian sailor
Espen Berntsen (born 1967), Norwegian football referee 
Gary Berntsen, American intelligence officer
Gunnar Berntsen (born 1977), German footballer
Harald Berntsen (born 1945), Norwegian historian 
Hedda Berntsen (born 1976), Norwegian skier
Ingrid Berntsen (born 1978), Norwegian skier 
Jack Berntsen (1940–2010), Norwegian musician
Jostein Berntsen (born 1943), Norwegian politician
Klaus Berntsen (1844–1927), Danish politician
Mona-Jeanette Berntsen, Norwegian hip-hop dancer
Ole Berntsen (1915–1996), Danish sailor 
Oluf Berntsen (1891–1987), Danish fencer
Parelius Hjalmar Bang Berntsen (1910–1995), Norwegian politician
Robin Berntsen (born 1970), Norwegian footballer
Simen Berntsen (born 1976), Norwegian ski jumper
Søren Berntsen (1880–1940), whaler
Thomas Berntsen (born 1970), Norwegian footballer
Thorbjørn Berntsen (born 1935), Norwegian politician
Tommy Berntsen (born 1973), Norwegian footballer
William Berntsen (1912–1994), Danish sailor

Danish-language surnames
Norwegian-language surnames